Roman Kowalewski (born 18 February 1949) is a Polish rower. He competed in the men's double sculls event at the 1972 Summer Olympics.

References

External links 
 
 
 
 

1949 births
Living people
Polish male rowers
Olympic rowers of Poland
Rowers at the 1972 Summer Olympics
Sportspeople from Szczecin